Obdulio Ávila Mayo (born 17 October 1974) is a Mexican politician from the National Action Party. From 2006 to 2009 he served as Deputy of the LX Legislature of the Mexican Congress representing the Federal District.

References

1974 births
Living people
Politicians from Guerrero
National Action Party (Mexico) politicians
21st-century Mexican politicians
National Autonomous University of Mexico alumni
Members of the Congress of Mexico City
Deputies of the LX Legislature of Mexico
Members of the Chamber of Deputies (Mexico) for Mexico City